Greene–Sullivan State Forest is a state forest in Dugger, Indiana. The forest provides fishing, camping, hunting, and horseback riding.

References

Indiana state forests
Protected areas of Greene County, Indiana
Protected areas of Sullivan County, Indiana